The 1995–96 Omani League was the 22nd edition of the top football league in Oman. Sur SC were the defending champions, having won the previous 1994–95 Omani League season. Sur SC emerged as the champions of the 1995–96 Omani League with a total of 56 points.

Teams
This season the league had 14 teams.

Stadia and locations

League table

Season statistics

Top scorers

Top level Omani football league seasons
1995–96 in Omani football
Oman